CJ Foodville is a South Korean western-style food and food service company based in Seoul that does catering service. CJ Foodville is a subsidiary of CJ Group.

History
Taking Korean food abroad, CJ Foodville has launched bakeries and restaurants globally.
Starting with opening a Tous les Jours store, a bakery chain, in Los Angeles in 2004, CJ has launched the chain also in China and Vietnam, where double-digit sales growth is maintained. The first Tous Les Jours in Hanoi, Vietnam, opened in June 2012, and in December 2012, the 20th and 21st Tous les Jours opened in New Jersey and New York.
Also brands of Foodville, VIPS (steakhouse) and A Twosome Place (coffee shope) have opened stores in China  and Vietnam as well as other countries in Asia.
Bibigo is a Bibimbap (a traditional Korean food) restaurant which CJ planned as a global brand from the beginning, opening in Los Angeles, Beijing and Singapore since 2010. It also opened its first store in London in 2012 during the London Olympics.

Subsidiaries
 Tous Les Jours
 VIPS
 The Place
 A Twosome Place
 Seasons Table
 Cheiljemyunso
 VIPS Burger
 China Factory Delight
 CJ Foodworld
 N Grill
 Juice Solution
 Bibigo
N Seoul Tower
Busan Tower

Past subsidiaries
 SkylarkL Co., Ltd. 
 Seafood Ocean
 Fisher's Market
 Cold Stone
 Rocco Curry
 China Factory 
 Dadam 
 Th Euo 
 MongJungHeon

References

External links

Companies based in Seoul
Food and drink companies established in 2000
South Korean companies established in 2000
CJ Group
Food and drink companies of South Korea
Catering and food service companies of South Korea